Dariya Khan's Tomb or Darya Khan's Dome or Ghummat is a medieval brick tomb in Shahibaug, Ahmedabad, India.

History and architecture
The tomb of Dariya Khan was built in 1453 during his lifetime. He was a talented minister and advisor of Mahmud Begada. The tomb, the largest in Gujarat, is of brick with nine feet thick wall unlike other tombs in Ahmedabad which are made of stones.
The tomb is made of the true arches and domes which create a cavernous interior as in Turko-Persian Islamic architecture. There is a large central dome surrounded by sixteen smaller domes and there are five entrances on each of the four sides of the structure. The interior houses the cenotaph surrounded by the arcaded verandah. The site is encroached upon now.

References 

 This article includes public domain text from 

Tombs in Ahmedabad
Monuments of National Importance in Gujarat